Jennifer Miel (born in Fort Lauderdale, Florida, United States) is the Executive Director of the United States Chamber of Commerce’s U.S.-Turkey Business Council, the home of the bilateral commercial relationship between the United States and Turkey.

Education 
Miel earned a B.S. in urban and regional planning and a B.A. in Spanish literature from Cornell University. She completed her graduate studies in public policy at Georgetown University.

Career 
As the Executive Director of the U.S. Chamber of Commerce’s U.S.-Turkey Business Council, Miel works closely with senior business leaders and has expanded the program from 12 to 60+ of the largest U.S. companies to advance their investments in Turkey. She directs the Council’s policy and programmatic agenda, including meetings with heads of state, senior government officials and the preparation and launch of report, “Upgrading the U.S.-Turkey Commercial Relationship: A Shared Vision toward a U.S.-Turkey Free Trade Agreement,” in Ankara in September 2015.

Miel also serves as the U.S.-Bahrain Business Council Executive Director and the U.S. Chamber of Commerce’s Turkey and Senior Director for Middle East Affairs supporting programming and policy formulation across Egypt and the Gulf Cooperation Council countries.

Achievements 

In 2014, she was part of the team that led the U.S. Chamber of Commerce to open its Regional Office in Istanbul which she now directs from Washington. This new office has established a permanent advocacy presence in the region for U.S. companies to grow and create enhanced economic opportunities for countries in Turkey and the Middle East.

In 2017, Miel was named one of the top 40 latino young professionals in foreign policy under 40 by the Huffington Post.  Additionally, she is active in the Association for Women in International Trade. Also, Miel has participated in the Million Women Mentors Summit.

Personal life
Miel married Geovanny Vicente, professor, political strategist and CNN columnist, on August 25, 2019. The couple has a son, Marvin Alejandro Vicente Miel, born in 2020.

Publications 

•  Miel, Jennifer. Why is Turkey Strategically Important for the United States? The Economic Dimension in the Age of Global Challenges and Challengers. In Daniel S. Hamilton, Serdar Altay & Aylin Ünver Noi (Eds.), Turkey in the North Atlantic Marketplace. Center for Transatlantic Relations SAIS. 2018. . 

•  Miel, Jennifer.The Post-COVID-19 Economic Recovery: U.S.-Turkey Commercial Ties that Bind. Insight Turkey. 2020.

•  Myron Brilliant, Jennifer Miel. 3 ways the US and Turkey can do business together. Business Insider. 2016.

References

External links
 

1986 births
Living people
United States Chamber of Commerce people
Businesspeople from Florida
Cornell University alumni
Georgetown University alumni
Businesspeople from Washington, D.C.